The 2021 American Athletic Conference women's basketball tournament was the postseason tournament held March 8–11, 2021, in the Dickies Arena in Fort Worth, Texas. South Florida won the tournament, its first, and earned an automatic bid to the NCAA tournament.

Seeds
All of the teams in the American Athletic Conference, except for SMU, will qualify for the tournament. SMU canceled their season after going 0-6, so they did not compete in the conference tournament. Teams are seeded based on conference record, and then a tiebreaker system will be used. Teams seeded 7–10 play in opening round, and teams seeded 1–6 receive a bye to the quarterfinals.

Schedule

Bracket

Note: * denotes overtime

See also
2021 American Athletic Conference men's basketball tournament

References

American Athletic Conference women's basketball tournament
2020–21 American Athletic Conference women's basketball season
College sports tournaments in Texas
Basketball competitions in Fort Worth, Texas
Women's sports in Texas